Kyurtchulu may refer to:
Kürçülü, Azerbaijan
Qorçulu, Azerbaijan